Defao (31 December 1958 – 27 December 2021) was a Congolese singer-songwriter. He was formerly a member of the prominent soukous groups Grand Zaiko Wawa and Choc Stars.

He formed his own group Big Stars in 1991, which accompanied him in all his performances. He has composed several hits, most since the late 1980s, including "Amour Scolaire", "Famille Kikuta", "Solange Lima" and many others. He died from complications of COVID-19 in Douala, Cameroon, on 27 December 2021, four days before his 63rd birthday.

Early life and musical beginnings 
Defao, born in Lulendo Matumona, was born on 31 December 1958 in Kinshasa, the capital of the Democratic Republic of the Congo.

His musical activities began in 1976. Matumona had moved to Inkisi, where he stayed until 1981 when guitarist Félix Manuaku Waku had come to recruit him to join his group, Grand Zaiko Wawa, which was based in Kinshasa.

After joining the band, he released his first vinyl, the single "Salima Na Ngai".

Musical career 
Defao left the group in 1983 to join Choc Stars, a recently formed band by Ben Nyamabo, Bozi Boziana and Roxy Tshimpaka. Matumona participated in all the albums of this group in the 80s and also composed some hits including "Ozi", "Déserteur", "Mister X" and also "Chagrin Dimone".

Big Stars 
In 1991, he decided to leave Choc Stars to create his own band, Big Stars, alongside Djo Poster Mumbata (also a former member of Grand Zaiko Wawa). Big Stars has revealed several talented singers including Montana Kamenga, Kabosé Bulembi, Théo Mbala, but also musicians such as Serge Kasongo Mboka Liya (AKA Burkina Faso) and Jagger Bokoko.

During Big Stars' early years, Defao enjoyed a very creative and productive period. In the 1990s he released at least seventeen albums, six of which hit the European market. He is recognized as a solo artist in the same league as Papa Wemba, Koffi Olomidé, Bozi Boziana and Kester Emeneya.

His seventh solo album, "Amour Scolaire", published in 1992, contains the eponymous hit which placed at the top of the Zairian hit parades. Likewise for "Famille Kikuta", released in 1994. The song revealed to him to audiences in East Africa, where it is popular to this day.

Following the "ndombolo" wave, between the years 1997 and 1998, Matumona released the albums "Sala Noki" and "Copinage" (the latter in collaboration with Mbilia Bel).

Big Stars hiatus 
In 2000, Defao disbanded Big Stars after a disagreement with its musicians. The band reformed in the late 2010s.

Solo career, later years and death 
Defao signed a record contract in 2000 with JPS Productions and proceeded to record his solo album "Nessy De London" with session musicians based in Paris including Nyboma, Wuta Mayi, Dally Kimoko, 3615 Code Niawu and Djudjuchet Luvengoka.

Defao then became inactive until 2006 when he released the album "Nzombo Le Soir", which was not promoted as widely his previous albums.

After another four years, he released the album "Pur Encore" in 2010. Besides the fact that the album was not available on CD, this one is also subject to a rather poor sound quality. This strange looseness shows once again that Matumona was having problems managing his career in a direction that can really capitalize on his great talent. However, Defao returned in 2012 with "The Undertaker", followed in 2016 by Any Time, in which he brought together notable musicians from both Congos, including Roga-Roga, Sam Tshintu, Manda Chante and his close friend and longtime collaborator, Godessy Lofombo.

Defao was based in Kenya since 2001. In August 2019, he returned triumphantly to Kinshasa and regrouped Big Stars with some of his former musicians including Montana Kamenga and Azanga. With them, he recorded his last album "Bety Poni".

While touring West Africa, Defao died on 27 December 2021 from COVID-19.

A few days later, the Congolese Minister of Culture and Arts agreed with his family to bring his body to Kinshasa for the funeral service to take place there. His last album "Bety Poni" was released on the day of his death.

Personal life 
Defao has been in several romantic relationships, but never married. At the time of his death, he left no widows or children.

Selected discography 
Defao's complete discography is unknown, as many of his albums were not sold internationally. Here is a selection of his most notable albums.

 Defao de Choc Stars (often referred as Chagrin Dimone, 1988)
 Defao et son groupe (often referred as Hitachi, 1989)
 La Saga de Defao (collaboration with Pepe Kalle, Carlyto Lassa, Luciana Demingongo and Koffi Olomide, 1989)
 Solange Muana Nsuka (1992)
 Amour Scolaire (1992)
 Donat (1994)
 Famille Kikuta (1994)
 Dernier Album 95 (1995)
 Sala Noki (1997)
 Copinage (collaboration with Mbilia Bel, 1998)
 Tremblement De Terre (1999)
 Nessy De London (2000)

References

External links

1958 births
2021 deaths
People from Kinshasa
Deaths from the COVID-19 pandemic in Cameroon
Democratic Republic of the Congo singers